Circuit des Remparts is a historic race circuit in Angoulême, France using the town's ancient road layout.

History
Used once in 1939 for a circuit race for Grand Prix cars and Formula Two voiturettes, The circuit had a length of 1287 metres, which was driven for 80 laps. This urban race track returned to use after World War II from 1947 to 1951 as part of the Formula 2 Championship, hosting events where famous drivers could be seen, such as Juan Manuel Fangio, Maurice Trintignant, Raymond Sommer, Robert Manzon, André Simon and the like.

Today a successful historic festival event continues, usually held in September, that gathers historic car enthusiasts for a series of races for classic and historic cars, on the original race track. It also features a "Concours d'Élégance" and a concours of car restoration.

The historic event was used as the basis for "Le Défi des Remparts" (1988), a volume of the Michel Vaillant comic book series.

Results

References

External links
 Circuit des Remparts website
 Race track détails

Defunct motorsport venues in France
Remparts
Remparts
Angoulême
Sports venues in Charente